Simon Caney (born 1966) is Professor of Political Theory at the University of Warwick and a member of the Nuffield Council on Bioethics.

Caney studied philosophy, politics, and economics at Merton College, Oxford, and was a postgraduate student of G. A. Cohen at Nuffield College, Oxford. He taught at the University of Newcastle, the University of Birmingham, and at Magdalen College, at the University of Oxford before taking up his position at Warwick as Professor of Political Theory.

Caney is the author of Justice Beyond Borders (Oxford University Press, 2005) and of many articles in politics and philosophy journals.

Books
Justice Beyond Borders: A Global Political Theory (Oxford: Oxford University Press, 2005).

References

External links
Oxford University staff page

Fellows of Magdalen College, Oxford
Living people
Academics of the University of Oxford
Alumni of Nuffield College, Oxford
Alumni of Merton College, Oxford
1966 births